ProRail is a Dutch government organisation responsible for the maintenance and extension of the national railway network infrastructure (not the metro or tram), the allocation of rail capacity, and controlling rail traffic. Prorail is a part of NS Railinfratrust, the Dutch railway infrastructure owner.

Its Utrecht headquarters is in the former offices of Nederlandse Spoorwegen (known as De Inktpot, "The Inkwell"), the largest brick building in the Netherlands.  The building currently features a "UFO" on its facade resulting from an art program in 2000. It was established on 1 January 2003 when three separate organisations responsible for rail infrastructure in the Netherlands were merged.

Operations

Railinfrabeheer
Railinfrabeheer (Rail Infrastructure Management, RIB) takes care of the infrastructure. This does not include most sidings on private property, these were sold off to Strukton Rail Short Line BV in 2015. Maintenance is carried out by several contractors, including VolkerRail, Strukton and ASSET Rail. Part of this division is the Incidentenbestrijding (Incident Response Unit) which manages various incidents on the network, like breakdowns, collisions or derailments.

Timetable Management
The capacity the whole railway network is controlled by ProRail. Every year on the second sunday of december the new timetable of the following year goes into effect, but planning this new timetable is done years in advance. In the planning stage all users can state the train services they wish to operate in this year. 

Companies using the ProRail network are:
 Nederlandse Spoorwegen (NS), using most of the network for long-distance intercity-services and local trains along the same lines. This network is commonly known as hoofdrailnet (main rail network).
 NMBS/SNCB, Thalys, Eurostar and DB, which operate various international services to neighbouring countries (including local trains to those countries).
 Connexxion (including Breng), Qbuzz, Arriva and Keolis on the other contracted lines. Arriva is the biggest in this respect, with train running in the north, east and south of the country.
 Cargo operators including DB Cargo, Rotterdam Rail Feeding, CapTrain, Rail Force One and Lineas. Most other cargo operators plan their trains shortly before departure, and thus are managed by Traffic Control.
 RailExperts, Train Charter Services and many cargo operators use the network for charters, ad-hoc trains or empty movements. These are mostly planned at short notice, using empty pathing provided in the timetable.

Railverkeersleiding
Railverkeersleiding (Traffic Control) is responsible for managing current operations on the network. Traffic Control is the section which operates signals and communicates with drivers. Short-term planning, less than 52 hours before the day of the train service, is also part of this division. All companies use this facility to compensate for unplanned events.

Funding 
Funding for ProRail is provided by a government subsidy, and a fee paid by the railway operators (called infraheffing).
The government subsidy totalled around €2.5 billion from 2014–2017, and the infraheffing totalled approx. €200 million in 2006, the remaining income was listed as 'other'.
The fee that the public transport operators have to pay for this is lower than the cost, but increasing. In 2003 it was €0.64 per train km and €0.54 to €2.16 for stopping at a station.

Performance oriented maintenance 
Railways in the Netherlands are not maintained by ProRail itself. Instead, it is subcontracted to recognised maintenance contractors. The Dutch railway network is subdivided into 21 areas. For each area, all of the regular maintenance is contracted as one package, which is won by the contractor that submits the best offer. The contractor receives a fixed sum per month, and is fined in case of failure to meet the required performance. Contractors are incentivised to minimise cost, while ensuring good performance of the assets. This is called prestatiegericht onderhoud (performance oriented maintenance).

As of 2019, the recognised maintenance contractors are:
 ASSET Rail (a joint venture by Arcadis and Dura Vermeer)
 BAM Infra Rail
 Strukton Rail
 VolkerRail

See also 
 Transportation in the Netherlands

References

External links 
Nederlandse Spoorwegen
Network statement 2003 (pdf-file, 646 kB)
ProRail

Railway infrastructure managers
Railway companies of the Netherlands
Rail infrastructure in the Netherlands
Railway companies established in 2003
Dutch companies established in 2003
Organisations based in Utrecht (city)
Rail transport in Utrecht (city)
Companies based in Utrecht (province)